Tutto l'amore che ti manca is a 1987 album by Julio Iglesias.

Track listing

Certifications and sales

References

1987 albums
Julio Iglesias albums
Italian-language albums